Indian law allows firearm possession on a may-issue basis. With approximately five civilian firearms per 100 people, India is the 120th civilly most armed country in the world.

History 
Prior to the Sepoy Mutiny in 1857, there were few gun control laws in India. The Indian Arms Act, 1878 regulated the manufacture, sale, possession, and carriage of firearms. The act included the mandatory licensing to carry a weapon, but contained exclusions for some groups and persons, for instance "all persons of Kodava (Coorg) race".

In the late 1890s, the British Empire was facing a series of internal insurrections in India (as well in Sudan), and the .450 calibre .577/450 Martini–Henry rifle was the most widely distributed firearm in the hands of the anti-British forces. In 1907 the British authorities banned civilians from possessing rifles chambered in a calibre corresponding to British military centerfire cartridges (e. g., .303, .450, and .577) to prevent them from being used against British troops and authorities, or even just bullets being pulled from military ammo and used to reload expended commercial cartridges.

That led to the replacement of the .303 with 8×50mmR Mannlicher, locally known as .315 Indian, demise of .375/303 hunting cartridge, which had to be replaced with .318, as well as to a rush by British rifle and ammunition makers to develop substitutes for now-banned popular big-game hunting rounds (Holland & Holland created the .465, Joseph Lang the .470, an unidentified firm the .475 Nitro Express, Eley Brothers the .475 No 2 Nitro Express and Westley Richards the .476, with the .470 NE becoming the most popular). .400 also gained some usage.

Right to bear arms also came into political space during Indian independence movement. Right to bear arms was admitted as a fundamental right into 1931 Karachi Resolution which was drafted by Gandhi. There was also debate of admitting Right to bear arms into Indian constitution during Drafting of the constitution But this was ultimately rejected by the constituent assembly .

In 1959 the Arms Act was passed with new strict rules. It has been amended many times since, most recently in 2019.

Current law 

Indian law divides firearm licenses into two types: 
 Prohibited Bore (PB) includes fully automatic, semi-automatic firearms and some other specified types which can only be issued by the central government for certain groups of people;
 Non-Prohibited Bore (NPB) includes remaining types of firearms and may be issued by central and state governments for ordinary citizens.

Non-Prohibited Bore Licenses 
The law states that a license can be issued to anyone who has a good reason without stipulating what constitutes a good reason. Typically, applicants wanting a license for self-defense purposes need to prove danger to their life. Article 14 states that authorities can deny a license for unspecified "public peace or for public safety" reasons. They are not obligated to give reason for refusal of an application if they deem it to be necessary. Firearm licenses must be renewed every five years. Approximately 50% of the applications for license are accepted. For example, of the 12.8 million inhabitants, between April 2015 and March 2016, authorities in Mumbai rejected 169 out of 342 firearm applications.

Some local jurisdictions may have additional requirements for granting licenses. For example in 2019 the commissioner of Firozpur district in Punjab ordered that every license applicant must plant at least 10 trees and take photos with them.

Carrying firearms 

Open carry of firearms is prohibited. All firearms must be carried in specially designed holsters.

Firearm possession 
As of 2016, there are 3,369,444 firearm licenses active in India with 9,700,000 firearms registered to them. According to Small Arms Survey, there are 61,401,000 illegal firearms in India.

The following is a breakdown of firearm licenses by state:

Gun crime

There are around 3.22 gun homicides per 100,000 people in India every year. Around 90% of them are committed using illegal guns.

See also 
 Overview of gun laws by nation

References

External links 
 

India
Law of India